The Waterford Museum of Treasures is a museum for historical artifacts associated with the city of Waterford. There are five museums in the Viking Triangle collectively known as Waterford Treasures. Its collection includes the 14th Century Waterford Charter Roll.

Constituent museums

Museum
The Viking Museum is housed in Reginald's Tower. Reginald's Tower is the oldest building in civic use in Ireland and is said to date from 1003 A.D. The Viking Museum contains a volume of artifacts, and a video screening on the top floor.

Medieval Museum
The Medieval Museum includes two medieval chambers, the 13th century Choristers’ Hall and the 15th century Mayor's Wine Vault. It also contains the only surviving piece of clothing worn by Henry VIII, a cap of maintenance. This was awarded to the Mayor of Waterford, along with a bearing sword, in 1536.

Bishop's Palace Museum

The Bishop's Palace Museum is a 250-year-old Georgian structure and contains artifacts dating from 17th century Waterford to the present day. The Anglo-German architect Richard Cassels initially designed the Bishop's Palace, which was constructed in 1741.  However, construction was completed by the architect John Roberts.

The Museum was originally the residence of the Church of Ireland Bishop of Waterford, and was built with its front facing the city wall which became part of the terraced garden of the Palace. It now faces the Mall in Waterford city and the new site of the Waterford Crystal factory.

The Museum tells the story of Waterford from 1700 to the 1970s and contains the only surviving Bonaparte 'mourning cross' which was one of 12 produced upon Napoleon Bonaparte's death in 1821.

The oldest surviving piece of Waterford Crystal, a Penrose decanter is also on exhibition which dates back to 1789.

The top floor of the building is dedicated to stories specific to Waterford's history, such as Ballybricken's pig markets, Waterford's Home Rule story, the Waterford during the First World War, the War of Independence in Waterford, childhood and household living in Waterford.

Awards
Waterford Museum of Treasures has received many awards to date as an International Museum of Heritage.

External links
 Waterford Museum of Treasures

References

Buildings and structures in Waterford (city)
City museums in the Republic of Ireland
Culture in Waterford (city)
Local museums in the Republic of Ireland
Tourist attractions in Waterford (city)
Religious museums in Ireland
Museums in County Waterford